The 2002 Kansas gubernatorial election was held on November 5, 2002. Incumbent Governor Bill Graves, a Republican, was barred from seeking a third term by the Kansas Constitution. Kansas Insurance Commissioner Kathleen Sebelius, the Democratic nominee, ran against Kansas State Treasurer Tim Shallenburger, the Republican nominee, with Sebelius defeating Shallenburger to become the second female Governor of Kansas after Joan Finney who served as governor from 1991 to 1995.

Democratic primary

Candidates
Kathleen Sebelius, Kansas Insurance Commissioner

Results

Republican primary

Candidates
Tim Shallenburger, Kansas State Treasurer (1999–present) and former state representative (1987-1998)
Running mate: Dave Lindstrom, former Kansas City Chiefs defensive end and businessman
Dave Kerr, Kansas State Senator
Running mate: Mary Birch, former president of the Overland Park Chamber of Commerce (1984-2002)
Bob Knight, Mayor of Wichita, Kansas
Running mate: Kent Glasscock, Speaker of the Kansas House of Representatives (2001-2003) and state representative (1991-2003), was Carla Stovall's running mate until she dropped out.
Dan Bloom, real estate developer and former Superintendent of the Eudora school district
Running mate: Eric Bloom, architectural engineering student

Withdrawn
Carla Stovall, Kansas Attorney General (1995-2003).
 Running mate: Kent Glasscock, Speaker of the Kansas House of Representatives (2001-2003) and state representative (1991-2003)
Initially, Stovall was one of the presumed "front-runner" candidates, and her anticipated run against the probable Democratic nominee, Kansas Insurance Commissioner Kathleen Sebelius, drew national attention as becoming possibly a rare "woman-vs.-woman" gubernatorial race. Though the front-runner among moderate candidates — and confident that she would win if she stayed in the race — Stovall dropped out in April, 2002, citing a lack of enthusiasm for campaigning, and for the job of governor, and announced plans to marry Kansas media mogul Larry Steckline, whom she married in August.

Stovall's abrupt withdrawal threw the moderate wing of the Kansas Republican Party into chaos, as they scrambled to replace her. Kent Glasscock, her running mate, was the heir-apparent, and claimed entitlement to Stovall's campaign funds, but conservative opponent Tim Shallenberger, the incumbent State Treasurer, argued that the funds, per his interpretation of state law, had to be returned to the state Republican party, or to the donors, a charity, or the state government's general revenue fund. Additional Republican candidates began to emerge, also, further complicating the race. Glasscock ultimately became a running mate for gubernatorial candidate Bob Knight.

Stovall's withdrawal was credited with giving advantage to the Democratic nominee (and ultimate victor), Katheleen Sebelius.

Results

General election

Predictions

Polling

Results

Notes

References

2002
Gubernatorial
Kansas